Chrysoesthia eppelsheimi is a moth of the family Gelechiidae. It is found in France, Germany and Switzerland.

The wingspan is 6–8 mm. There are three metallic silvery transverse fasciae on the forewings.

The larvae feed on Silene flavescens, Silene nutans and Silene vulgaris. They mine the leaves of their host plant. The mine starts as a winding gallery with brown frass. The gallery widens into a full-depth, transparent, elongate blotch with a central black frass line. Larvae can be found from June to September.

References

Moths described in 1885
Chrysoesthia
Moths of Europe